Actiocyon was an extinct genus of ailurid that existed from the Middle Miocene of North America. The type species, Actiocyon leardi, was described in 1947 by the American paleontologist Chester Stock.

Description
The holotype consisted of portions of a snout containing the palate with some teeth. Stock noted overall similarities to their contemporary genus Alopecocyon of Europe, though he tentatively classified Actiocyon as a procyonid due to the structure of fourth premolar and first molar. Some later authors have suggested Actiocyon to be a junior synonym of Alopecocyon, though others have maintained the two as separated but related genera due to difference in dental and jaw morphology. A second and earlier species, A. parverratis, was described by Smith et al. (2016) and was the earliest known simocyonine from North America.

References 

Prehistoric mammals of North America
Prehistoric carnivoran genera
Ailuridae
Fossil taxa described in 1947
Miocene musteloids